The Bishop of Marlborough was an episcopal title used by a Church of England suffragan bishop, firstly in the 16th century for the Diocese of Salisbury, and secondly in the late 19th and early 20th century for the Diocese of London.

The title takes its name after the town of Marlborough, Wiltshire and was first created under the Suffragan Bishops Act 1534. After the 1560s, the title fell into abeyance until it was revived in 1888, at the suggestion of the then  Bishop of London, to assist in the running of the rapidly expanding Diocese of London.

List of bishops of Marlborough

References

Bishops of Marlborough
Marlborough
Marlborough
Marlborough
1534 establishments in England